Hop! Channel (Hebrew: , Arutz Hop!) is an Israeli children's television channel intended entirely for preschool children. The channel caters for children between the ages of zero and seven years old, presenting programs specifically tailored for these age-groups respectively. It was launched in February 2000 in Israel; it broadcasts daily between 5:00 am (in the past: 06:00 am) and 11:00 pm (in the past: 8:00 pm), as a part of the base packages of cable company HOT and satellite company yes.

History
Hop! Channel was launched in February 2000 in Israel by Alona Ebet and Tamir Paul. The channel caters for children between the ages of zero and seven years old, presenting programs specifically tailored for this age-group. It is one of the first channels in the world that belong to preschool children, in contrast to many other Israeli kids channels like Arutz HaYeladim that caters for children between the ages of seven and fourteen years old, and has programs that do not fit preschool children. The slogan and the main song of the channel is "Hop! To grow up in good hands"; the main song sung by Ariel Zilber and later by the channel's presenters. Ever since the channel's launch in February 2000, it broadcasts from 6:00 am to 8:00 pm, which is 15 hours daily. Since they changed the time slot by then, the channel broadcasts from 5:00 am to 11:00 pm Tel-Aviv Israeli time, which is now 18 hours daily.

The channel's logo is a red, yellow, green and blue kite. Idents between programs show other characters as well: a bird, a mouse, a puppy, a cat and previously, a fly, a spider, a clock, and a penguin. Another character that has been identified with the channel in the past is a purple spacecraft called "Tralalit".

In 2002, the channel got the rights from production company Sesame Workshop to produce and broadcast an Israeli adaptation based on the Sesame Street series. Entitled "Rechov Sumsum", Hop! Channel started to produce the series in 2006, up until 2016. Four seasons of Rechov Sumsum, along with a spin-off series titled Hop! I Know, were produced.

In 2006, Romania, in partnership with Israel, launched Boom Hop! on Boom TV, a local version of the channel in Romanian. The channel was closed in 2012.

Programming

Current

Upcoming 
 Strawberry Shortcake: Berry in the Big City

Former 

 64 Zoo Lane - רחוב החיות 64
 The Adventures of Chuck and Friends - עמית המשאית
 The Adventures of Hello Kitty & Friends - הרפתקאות הלו קיטי וחברים
 The Adventures of Napkin Man! - מפיוני גיבור על
 The Adventures of Paddington Bear - הרפתקאות הדוב פדינגטון
 Amazing Animals - חיות מדהימות
 Animal Mechanicals - הטקטקים
 Andy Pandy - אנדי פנדי
 Andy's Dinosaur Adventures - יהלי חוקר הדינוזאורים
 Andy's Wild Adventures - יהלי שומר הטבע
 The Animal Shelf - מדף הצעצועים
 Animal Stories - סיפורי חיות
 Astro Farm - חוות החלל
 The Babaloos - הבילבילים
 Babar - המלך בבר
 Babar and the Adventures of Badou - המלך בבר: הרפתקאותיו של באדו
 The Backyardigans - חבורת החצר
 Bananas in Pyjamas - בננות בפיג'מות
 Bangers and Mash - בני ומוש
 Barbapapa - ברבאבא
 Barney - ברני הכלב
 Barney and Friends - החברים של ברני
 Bear in the Big Blue House - הדוב בבית הכחול
 Benjamin the Elephant - בני הפיל
 The Berenstain Bears - משפחת דובינשטיין
 Bert and Ernie's Great Adventures - ההרפתקאות המופלאות של אריק ובנץ
 The Big Comfy Couch - הספה הגדולה
 Bill and Ben (2001) - ביל ובן
 Blue's Clues - הרמזים של בלו
 Blinky Bill - בלינקי ביל
 Boblins - בובלינים
 Bob the Builder - בוב הבנאי
 Bob the Builder (2015) - בוב הבנאי
 Boo! - !בו
 Brum - בראם
 Bunnytown - עיר הארנבים
 Busytown Mysteries - כל הכבוד לנמרוד
 Caillou - קאיו
 Care Bears: Adventures in Care-a-Lot - דובוני אכפת לי
 Care Bears and Cousins - דובוני אכפת לי ובני דודים
 Care Bears: Unlock the Magic - דובוני אכפת לי: הקסם מתחיל
 Care Bears: Welcome to Care-a-Lot - דובוני אכפת לי
 The Cat in the Hat Knows a Lot About That! - יוצאים לטיול עם חתול תעלול
 Charlie Chalk - צ'רלי צ'וק
 Christopher Crocodile - כריסטופר התנין
 Chuggington - עיר הקטרים
 Clifford the Big Red Dog - קליפורד
 Connie the Cow - קוני העגלה
 Construction Site - חבורת הדחפורים
 Cubeez - קובידוביות
 Dinosaur Train - רכבת הדינוזאורים
 Dino Dan - דינו דן
 Doki - דוקי
 Dora the Explorer - מגלים עם דורה
 Dot. - דוט
 Dragon Tales - סיפורי דרקונים
 Eddy and the Bear- אודי והדובי
 El Nombre - אנריקו מספריקו
 Ella Bella Bingo - אלה בלה
 Elliot Moose - אליוט הצבי
 Elmo's World - עולמו של אלמו
 Elmo's World (2017) - עולמו של אלמו
 Elmo the Musical - המופע של אלמו
 Engie Benjy - גיא המכונאי
 Everything's Rosie - החיוך של רוזי
 The Family-Ness - משפחת לצת
 Fetch the Vet - דוקטור חיים
 Fifi and the Flowertots - פיפי והניצנים
 Fimbles - פימבלס
 Finley the Fire Engine - עילי מכבה האש 
 The Forgotten Toys - הצעצועים העזובים
 Franklin - פרנקלין
 Franny's Feet - הנעליים של יולי
 Go, Diego, Go! - 
 Grandpa in My Pocket - סבא מתכווץ
 Groundling Marsh - הבוצנים
 Guess with Jess - יש לנחש עם חן
 Harry and His Bucket Full of Dinosaurs - הארי ודלי הדינוזאורים
 Handy Manny - נדב ידי זהב
 Hilltop Hospital - בית חולים על הגובה
 The Hoobs - ההופסים
 In the Night Garden... - הגן הקסום
 Jakers! The Adventures of Piggley Winks - הרפתקאות זיזי וינקס
 James the Cat - ג'יימס החתול
 Joshua Jones - יואל החובל
 JoJo's Circus - הקרקס של ג'וג'ו
 Justin Time - מוני דמיוני
 Kerwhizz - 
 Kipper - קיפר
 The Koala Brothers - האחים קואלה
 Lazy Lucy - טלי ממציאה לי
 LazyTown - נווה עצלנות
 LazyTown Extra - נווה עצלנות
 The Lingo Show - מופע הלינגו
 Little Bill - ביל הקטן
 Little Einsteins - חבורת איינשטיין
 Little Red Tractor - הטרקטור האדום
 Little Robots - רובוטים קטנים
 Lizzie's Library - הספרייה של ליזי
 Louie - שוקי הצייר
 Louie's Friends - החברים של נוני 
 Louie's World - עולמו של נוני
 Lunar Jim - ג'ים על הירח
 Lupin's Tales - אגדות לופין
 Madeline - מדלן
 Maggie and the Ferocious Beast - מגי והמפלץ
 Magic Adventures of Mumfie - ממפי
 Magic Lantern - פָּנָס הקסם 
 Maisy - מייסי
 Make Way for Noddy - פנו דרך לנאדי
 Manon - מנור
 Max & Ruby - מקס ורובי
 Me, Eloise - דניאל
 Merlin the Magical Puppy - מרלין
 Mickey Mouse Clubhouse - מועדון החברים של מיקי מאוס
 Milly, Molly - מילי ומולי
 Mike the Knight - מייק האביר
 Mister Maker - מר מוכשר
 Mitch Match - פאזלונים
 Mixed up Mary - איילת אולי תחליטי? 
 Monty the Dog - מונטי הכלב
 Mopatop's Shop - החנות של מופטופ
 Mr. Men and Little Miss - אדון וגברת בשינוי אדרת
 The Mr. Men Show - המופע של מר שמח
 Muffin the Mule - פנחס הפרד
 Mumble Bumble - ממבל במבל
 My Friends Tigger & Pooh - חבריי טיגר ופו
 My Little Pony: Friendship Is Magic - הפוני הקטן שלי: חברות היא קסם
 Nature Cat - טבע של חתול
 Nellie the Elephant - נלי הפילה
 Nini's Treehouse - הבית של ניני
 Noddy - נאדי בארץ הצעצועים
 Noddy's Toyland Adventures - נאדי פעמוני
 Nuzzle and Scratch - גרד וגרד
 Orm and Cheep - תול וציף
 Paz - פז
 PB Bear and Friends - פיבי הדוב
 Peg + Cat - ים ועוד מיאו
 Peep and the Big Wide World - קוקו מגלה את העולם
 Peppa Pig - פפה
 Picme - תראו אותי
 Pimpa - פימפה
 Pingu - פינגו
 Pingu in the City - פינגו בעיר הגדולה
 Pinky Dinky Doo - פינקי דינקי דו
 The Pondles - הטפטפים
 Poko - פוקו וחבריו
 Postman Pat - דן הדוור
 The Raggy Dolls - בסל הבובות
 Roary the Racing Car - ברק ומכוניות המירוץ
 Rob the Robot - רובי הרובוט
 Roobarb - טושטוש
 Rolie Polie Olie - רולי פולי אולי
 Rubbadubbers - ראבאדאברס
 Ruffus the Dog - רופוס הכלב
 Rusty Rivets - ראסטי
 Sarah & Duck - רז וברווז
 The Save-Ums! - כוח הצלה
 Sesame Street - רחוב סומסום
 Simsala Grimm - סימסאלה גרים
 Skeeper and Skeeto - חיש ופלא
 Special Agent Oso - סוכן מיוחד אוסו
 Spot - פינוקי
 Stoppit and Tidyup - די ותסדר
 Strawberry Shortcake's Berry Bitty Adventures - תותית
 Tama and Friends - תמה וחברים
 Taoshu - טאו שו

 Tec the tractor - טקי הטרקטור
 Teddybears - הדובונים
 Teletubbies - טלטאביז
 Theodore Tugboat - טדי ספינת הגרר
 This is Daniel Cook - דניאל יוצא לחקור
 This is Emily Yeung - אלינור יוצאת לחקור
 Thomas & Friends - תומס הקטר וחברים
 Timbuctoo - טימבקטו
 Timothy Goes to School - טימותי הולך לבית הספר
 Timmy Time - טימי הטלה
 Toot and Puddle - טוש ופרי
 The Toy Castle - טירת הצעצועים
 Tork - טורק
 ToddWorld - העולם של טל
 Tree Fu Tom - טבע תום
 Turbo Dogs - כלבי המחץ
 Vipo: Adventures of the Flying Dog - ויפו הכלב המעופף
 Waybuloo - ווייבולו
 Why? - 
 Wooly - צמר והקווים 
 Wow! Wow! Wubbzy! - באו באו באבי
 Yo Gabba Gabba! - 
 YooHoo & Friends - יוהו וחברים
 Yoho Ahoy - יוהו אהוי
 Zoboomafoo'' - זובומפו

International Defunct Channels

Note

References

External links

Television channels in Israel
Television channels and stations established in 2000
Children's television networks
2000 establishments in Israel
Childhood in Israel
Preschool education television networks